Electronic watch may refer to:

 Electric watch, pre-quartz watches powered electronically
 Quartz watch, watches whose timekeeping element is quartz crystal

Horology